Mahmud Khalid is a Ghanaian politician and a  former Minister of State. He is a member of the National Democratic Congress (Ghana) of Ghana. He served briefly as the Minister for  the Upper West Region in the Mills government.

While he was in office, allegations of bias towards Ahmadi Muslims. Due to this, on 11 May 2010,he was dismissed by the President of Ghana, John Atta Mills. Khalid suggested members of his party lobbied for his dismissal. Alhaji Issaku Saliah, a former MP for Wa East was nominated as his replacement and approved by parliament on 23 July 2010.

References

See also
List of Mills government ministers
National Democratic Congress (Ghana)

Living people
Year of birth missing (living people)
Government ministers of Ghana
National Democratic Congress (Ghana) politicians
Ghanaian Ahmadis